Tamra is an Arab city in the Lower Galilee in Israel.

Tamra may also refer to:
Tamra, Jezreel Valley, an Arab village in the Jezreel Valley in Israel
Tamra, the Island, a 2009 South Korean television series
Technical and Miscellaneous Revenue Act of 1988, an act of the U.S. Congress related to Social Security
 Carboxytetramethylrhodamine (TAMRA), a derivative of the dye rhodamine

Tamra is also an alternative spelling of the female given name Tamara. People with this given name include:
Tamra Davis (born 1962), American film and television director
Tamra Mercieca (born 1980), Australian author
Tamra Borchardt-Slayton (born 1987), chairperson and leader of the Paiute Indian Tribe of Utah
Tamra Keenan, Irish singer-songwriter

See also
Tamna, an ancient kingdom located on modern day Jeju Island, South Korea